Wile may refer to:

People
 John Wile (born 1947), English football player and manager
 Matt Wile (born 1992), American football player

Arts, entertainment, and media
 WILE (AM), a radio station (1270 AM) licensed to Cambridge, Ohio, United States
 WILE-FM, a radio station (97.7 FM) licensed to Byesville, Ohio, United States
 Wile E. Coyote, a character of Looney Tunes

Other uses
 M. Wile and Company Factory Building, in Buffalo, NY, USA
 Wile Cup, a croquet trophy initiated at the University of British Columbia

See also
 
 While (disambiguation)
 Wiles (disambiguation)